The Pakistan cricket team toured New Zealand in December 2020 and January 2021 to play two Test and five Twenty20 International (T20I) matches. The Test series formed part of the inaugural 2019–2021 ICC World Test Championship. In August 2020, New Zealand Cricket confirmed that the tour was going ahead, and were working with their government to comply with biosecurity during the COVID-19 pandemic. On 29 September 2020, New Zealand Cricket confirmed the full schedule of the tour.

On 10 November 2020, Babar Azam was appointed captain of Pakistan's Test side, replacing Azhar Ali. However, he did not play in any matches on the tour, after breaking his thumb in a training session.

New Zealand won the first two T20I matches, therefore winning the series with a game to spare. Pakistan won the third and final match by four wickets, with New Zealand winning the series 2–1.

New Zealand won the first Test by 101 runs, extending their unbeaten run at home to 16 matches. New Zealand won the second Test by an innings and 176 runs, to win the series 2–0. The series win meant that they finished top of ICC Test Team Rankings for the first time.

Squads

Pakistan named a squad of 35 players for the tour. On 22 November 2020, Pakistan's Fakhar Zaman was ruled out of the tour due to a fever and did not travel with the team to New Zealand. On 13 December 2020, Babar Azam was ruled out of the T20I series, after he broke his thumb in a training sessions. As a result, Shadab Khan was named as the captain of Pakistan's squad for the T20I series. Babar Azam was also ruled out of Pakistan's squad for the first Test, with Mohammad Rizwan named as captain of the side. Ahead of the first Test, Shadab Khan was ruled out of the match due to an injury. Zafar Gohar was added to Pakistan's squad as Khan's replacement. On 26 December 2020, the Pakistan Cricket Board (PCB) confirmed that Shadab Khan had been ruled out of the second Test, and Pakistan's home Test series against South Africa. Imam-ul-Haq was also ruled out of Pakistan's Test squad, due to a fractured thumb. On 2 January 2021, the PCB confirmed that Babar Azam had also been ruled out of second Test match.

New Zealand named Mitchell Santner as captain for the first T20I, with Kane Williamson named as captain for the remaining matches. Santner, along with Blair Tickner, Mark Chapman, Jacob Duffy and Doug Bracewell were included for the first T20I, before being replaced by Trent Boult, Kane Williamson, Kyle Jamieson, Daryl Mitchell and Tim Southee. Lockie Ferguson and Colin de Grandhomme were both ruled out of New Zealand's Test squad due to injuries, with New Zealand Cricket naming the Test squad on 21 December 2020. Neil Wagner was ruled out of New Zealand's squad for the second Test, after suffering two broken toes during the first Test. Matt Henry was named as Wagner's replacement for the second Test.

Practice matches
The Pakistan A team were scheduled to play two four-day matches against the New Zealand A team, one in Queenstown and  one in Whangārei, in December 2020. Both fixtures were unofficial Test matches, with first-class status. However, the first match was cancelled following a delay for the Pakistan cricketers to practice in isolation. The Pakistan squad opted to play intra-squad matches in Queenstown instead. The Pakistan A squad also played twenty-over matches against several New Zealand domestic sides.

T20I series

1st T20I

2nd T20I

3rd T20I

4th T20I

5th T20I

Test series

1st Test

2nd Test

Notes

References

External links
 Series home at ESPN Cricinfo

2020 in New Zealand cricket
2021 in New Zealand cricket
2020 in Pakistani cricket
2021 in Pakistani cricket
International cricket competitions in 2020–21
Pakistani cricket tours of New Zealand